Wendler Spur is a rock spur that descends north between Albert Valley and Papitashvili Valley in the Apocalypse Peaks of Victoria Land. Named in 2005 by the Advisory Committee on Antarctic Names after Gerd Wendler, Geophysical Institute, University of Alaska, Fairbanks; a United States Antarctic Program member in an international collaboration (France, Australia, United States) to study katabatic winds and their interaction with sea ice at Adélie Coast and George V Coast; several field seasons 1979–2001.

References

Cliffs of Victoria Land